The Fran Lebowitz Reader is a 1994 collection of comedic essays by writer Fran Lebowitz.

The book is a compilation of essays from Lebowitz's previous bestsellers Metropolitan Life from 1978 and 1981's Social Studies.

The book was reissued to include reference to the Martin Scorsese documentary film Public Speaking, which illustrates the life and work of Lebowitz.

References

1994 non-fiction books
American essay collections
English-language books
Jewish comedy and humor
Comedy books
Books about New York City
Books by Fran Lebowitz